Mera Yahan Koi Nahin is a Pakistani family drama series, produced by Asif Raza Mir and Babar Javed under their production banner A&B Entertainment. The drama airs twice weekly on Geo Entertainment every Friday and Saturday on Prime time. It stars Anum Fayyaz, Farhan Ally Agha and Zainab Qayyum in lead roles. The drama is based upon father-daughter relations.

Cast
Anum Fayyaz
Farhan Ally Agha
Zainab Qayyum
Asim Mehmood
Waseem Tirmazi
Nida Khan
Azekah Daniel

References

Pakistani family television dramas